Séamus Turlough McElwaine (also spelt Seamus McElwain; 1 April 1960 – 26 April 1986) was a volunteer in the South Fermanagh Brigade of the Provisional Irish Republican Army (IRA) during The Troubles  who was shot dead by the British Army.

Early life
McElwaine was the oldest of eight children and was born and grew up in the townland of Knockacullion, beside the hamlet and townland of Knockatallon, near the village of Scotstown in the north-west of County Monaghan in the Republic of Ireland.

McElwaine took his first steps towards becoming involved in physical force republicanism when he joined Na Fianna Éireann aged 14. At the age of 16, McElwaine turned down an opportunity to study in the United States and joined the IRA, stating "no one will ever be able to accuse me of running away".

Paramilitary activities

McElwaine was an active member of the IRA, who became Officer Commanding of the IRA in County Fermanagh by the age of 19. On 5 February 1980, McElwaine killed off-duty Ulster Defence Regiment (UDR) corporal Aubrey Abercrombie as he drove a tractor in the townland of Drumacabranagher, near Florencecourt. Later that year, on 23 September, McElwaine killed off-duty Royal Ulster Constabulary (RUC) Reserve Constable Ernest Johnston outside his home in Roslea. He was suspected of involvement in at least 10 other killings.

On 14 March 1981, a detachment of the British Army surrounded a farmhouse near Roslea, containing McElwaine and three other IRA members. Despite being armed with four rifles, including an Armalite, the IRA members surrendered and were arrested. While on remand in Crumlin Road Gaol, McElwaine stood in the February 1982 Irish general election as an independent candidate for Cavan–Monaghan and received 3,974 votes (6.84% of the vote). In May 1982 McElwaine was convicted of murdering the RUC and UDR members, with the judge describing him as a "dangerous killer" and recommending he spend at least 30 years in prison.

On 25 September 1983, McElwaine was involved in the Maze Prison escape, the largest break-out of prisoners in Europe since World War II and in British prison history. 38 republican prisoners, armed with 6 handguns, hijacked a prison meals lorry and smashed their way out of the Maze prison.

After the escape, he joined an IRA active service unit (ASU) operating in the area of the border between Counties Monaghan and Fermanagh. The unit targeted police and military patrols with gun and bomb attacks, while sleeping rough in barns and outhouses to avoid capture.

Death

On 26 April 1986, McElwaine and another IRA member, Seán Lynch from near Lisnaskea, were preparing to ambush a British Army patrol near Roslea in the south-east of County Fermanagh when they were ambushed themselves by a detachment from the Special Air Service (SAS) Regiment. Both were severely wounded; Lynch managed to escape while McElwaine was questioned then shot dead while incapacitated.

McElwaine was buried in Scotstown, his funeral was attended by an estimated 3,000 people, including Gerry Adams and Martin McGuinness; the latter gave an oration describing McElwaine as "a brave intelligent soldier, a young man who gave up his youth to fight for the freedom of his country" and "an Irish freedom fighter murdered by British terrorists".

In 1987, McElwaine's father, Jimmy, a longtime member of Monaghan County Council, became the chairman of the Séamus McElwain Cumann of Republican Sinn Féin.

On 1 April 1990, a monument to McElwaine was erected in Corlat, a townland beside Knockatallon in the north-west of County Monaghan. The oration was given by a Catholic priest, Father Piaras Ó Dúill, who compared McElwaine to Nelson Mandela, saying they both had the same attitude to oppression and both refused to denounce principle. The inscription on the monument is a quote from Patrick Pearse; "As long as Ireland is unfree the only honourable attitude for Irishmen and Irishwomen is an attitude of revolt". A monument to McElwaine and six other republicans was erected in Roslea in 1998, and unveiled by veteran republican Joe Cahill.

In January 1993, an inquest jury returned a verdict that McElwaine had been unlawfully killed. The jury ruled the soldiers had opened fire without giving him a chance to surrender, and that he was shot dead five minutes after being wounded. The Director of Public Prosecutions requested a full report on the inquest from the RUC, but no one has been prosecuted for McElwaine's death.

In April 2006, approximately 1,000 people in Roslea paid tribute to McElwaine during the traditional Easter Commemoration to mark the centenary of the Easter Rising. Victims groups and unionist politicians, including Democratic Unionist Party (DUP) member Arlene Foster, had asked the Parades Commission to ban the parade from the area where McElwaine was killed, describing him as an "evil murderer", but the Commission ruled the commemoration could proceed without any restriction. In Corlat, two weeks later, some 500 people attended the launch of a documentary film about McElwaine, Life and death of an IRA activist, marking the 20th anniversary of his death.

References

1960 births
1986 deaths
Deaths by firearm in Northern Ireland
Escapees from British detention
Irish escapees
Irish people convicted of murdering police officers
Irish republicans
Irish republicans imprisoned on charges of terrorism
People from County Monaghan
People killed by security forces during The Troubles (Northern Ireland)
Provisional Irish Republican Army members